Silvia Iklé (born 12 January 1949) is a Swiss equestrian. She competed in two events at the 2004 Summer Olympics.

References

External links
 

1949 births
Living people
Swiss female equestrians
Swiss dressage riders
Olympic equestrians of Switzerland
Equestrians at the 2004 Summer Olympics
Sportspeople from St. Gallen (city)